2011 Thai Premier League (known as Sponsor Thai Premier League for sponsorship reasons) was the 15th season of the Thai Premier League since its establishment in 1996. A total of 18 teams are competing in the league due to a two team expansion, with Muangthong United as the defending champions.

The season started on 12 February 2011 and is generally broken down into 2 legs. The first leg being played from February to early June with the second leg taking place from late July to November.

During the league break, the opening rounds of the FA Cup and League Cup take place.

Teams
Bangkok United were relegated to the 2011 Thai Division 1 League after finishing the 2010 season in the bottom three places and lost in promotion/relegation play-off.

2010 Thai Division 1 League champions Sriracha, runners-up Khonkaen and third place Chiangrai United were promoted to the Thai Premier League.

Stadia and locations

Name changes

TOT-CAT were renamed TOT S.C. after an ownership dispute.
Rajnavy Rayong were renamed Siam Navy after an ownership dispute.

Stadium changes

Both Pattaya United and Siam Navy moved into the IPE Stadium in Chonburi. Pattaya's previous ground Nongprue Municipality Football Field is under renovation and Siam Navy left the Rayong Stadium as they withdrew from the province during their ownership dispute. Both teams use the same stadium even though this is actually against the league regulations. Siam Navy were to move back to Rayong and use the Sattahip Navy Stadium for the 2nd leg of the season.
TOT continued to use Muangthong United's Yamaha Stadium for the opening half of the season before their return to the TOT Stadium Chaeng Watthana for the 2nd leg. TOT also used the Thai Army Sports Stadium for one game in the first leg of the season.
Chonburi moved to the ODB Chonburi Stadium whilst a new ground is built in Bang San.
Sriracha's Princess Sirindhorn Stadium will be known as the Suzuki Stadium due to sponsorship reasons.
BEC Tero Sasana presumably have made the Thephasadin Stadium as their new home, using it for the second season running after their previous home Nong Chok Stadium was apparently being renovated. The move has also brought a bigger fan base to the club.
Chonburi used one of their former grounds, the IPE Stadium for two games after being suspended from using their home ground due to fan violence. Chonburi fans were also subjected to be banned from the stadium.
Bangkok Glass used the Thephasadin Stadium and the Yamaha Stadium for their home matches with Samut Songkhram and Pattaya United due to the Leo Stadium being unavailable during the 2011 Thai Flood's.
Police United used the Suphanburi Municipality Stadium and the Khao Plong Stadium in Chainat for their home matches with Pattaya United, Bangkok Glass, Khon Kaen (all Suphanburi Municipality Stadium) and Muangthong United (Khao Plong Stadium) due to the Thammasat Stadium being unavailable during the 2011 Thai Flood's.

Thai Premier League All-Star Exhibition game

Personnel and sponsoring

Managerial changes

Ownership changes

League table

Results

Season statistics

Top scorers

Hat-tricks

Attendances

Champions
The league champion was Buriram PEA. It was the team's second title.

See also
 2011 Thai Division 1 League
 2011 Regional League Division 2
 2011 Thai FA Cup
 2011 Kor Royal Cup

References

External links
Official website

2011
1